Rino Mondellini (1908-1974) was an Italian art director known for his work in the French film industry.

Selected filmography
 Come Down, Someone Wants You (1951)
 The Night Is My Kingdom (1951)
 Shadow and Light (1951)
 Forbidden Fruit (1952)
 Children of Love (1953)
 Mademoiselle from Paris (1955)
 Trapeze (1956)
 The Lebanese Mission (1956)
 The Adventures of Arsène Lupin (1957)
 Lift to the Scaffold (1958)
 Tabarin (1958)
 Serenade of Texas (1958)
 Ravishing (1960)
 Le Tracassin (1961)
 Fanny (1961)
 The Champagne Murders (1967)
 Two Weeks in September (1967)
 The Young Wolves (1968)

References

Bibliography
 Hayward, Susan. Simone Signoret: The Star as Cultural Sign. Continuum, 2004.

External links

1908 births
1974 deaths
Italian art directors
Italian emigrants to France
Film people from Milan